Tony Humphries is a former administrator of the British Indian Ocean Territory (BIOT), a British overseas territory in the Indian Ocean. Humphries was an administrator from February 2005 to December 2007.

References

British Indian Ocean Territory people
Living people
Year of birth missing (living people)